The 2010 FIA GT1 World Championship was the inaugural FIA GT1 World Championship, a motor racing competition reserved for FIA GT1 cars. The championship was a replacement for the FIA GT Championship which had been held annually from 1997 to 2009. It was the first sports car racing series to be sanctioned by the Fédération Internationale de l'Automobile (FIA) as a World Championship since the demise of the World Sportscar Championship at the end of the 1992 season.

Developed by the Stéphane Ratel Organisation (SRO), the 2010 championship was decided over ten events in ten countries on three continents. It was contested by twelve teams, each being independent of the automobile manufacturer that they represented, although they were permitted limited support from that manufacturer. Aston Martin, Corvette, Ford, Lamborghini, Maserati, and Nissan were each represented by two teams. Unlike the FIA GT Championship, where several tyre manufacturers competed, the FIA GT1 World Championship has a single provider, Michelin.

Michael Bartels and Andrea Bertolini, who won the final FIA GT Championship for Drivers in 2009, won the first GT1 World Championship for Drivers with a race to spare. Despite finishing twelfth in the Qualification Race in Argentina, Bartels and Bertolini were assured of the title as the Young Driver AMR pairing of Tomáš Enge and Darren Turner could only finish tenth which failed to keep them within reach. A non-scoring weekend for Enge and Turner dropped them to fourth in the final championship standings, as Matech Competition's Thomas Mutsch and Hexis AMR's Frédéric Makowiecki moved into second and third places respectively as Makowiecki won both races and Mutsch finished second in each race. With the assistance of Miguel Ramos, Enrique Bernoldi and Alexandre Negrão in the team's second car during the season, Vitaphone Racing also claimed the Teams' Championship in the same race, as Young Driver AMR, Hexis AMR and Reiter all failed to score enough points to take the championship to a final race.

Aston Martin was awarded the SRO Trophy for Manufacturers.

Calendar
The SRO announced a provisional 2010 calendar featuring twelve events, although host circuits were not named. A revised twelve event calendar was announced on 21 October 2009, removing the previously planned rounds for Argentina, Australia, Bulgaria, Italy, Romania, and Russia. Eastern Creek Raceway had been part of the unsuccessful bid for the Australian round, while the Russian round planned for 2010 was cancelled due to delays in the completion of the Eurasia Autodromo, while Romania's planned event was cancelled due to a change in the Bucharest government.  A further calendar was released on 11 December 2009 with just ten rounds listed, removing the proposed Canadian, Hungarian, and Chinese rounds but adding the Argentinian round at the Potrero de los Funes Circuit once more.  The Yas Marina Circuit later requested to the FIA that their event be pushed back two weeks to the weekend of 17 April in order to avoid a conflict with the FIA World Cup for Cross Country Rallies which was to be held in the United Arab Emirates on 5 April. The British round was to incorporate the RAC Tourist Trophy while also serving as the first motor racing event held on the newly built Arena layout for the Silverstone Circuit. Circuit de Spa-Francorchamps would continue to host a round, but the GT1 races would be held separately from the Spa 24 Hours during the same weekend.

In July 2010, following delays in completing alterations to the Durban street circuit due to construction for the 2010 FIFA World Cup, the South African round was postponed until 2011.  A Spanish event at the brand new Circuito de Navarra was proposed as a replacement for Durban on the calendar, and was confirmed at the FIA World Motor Sport Council meeting of 24 October.

All events consisted of a one-hour Qualifying race and a one-hour Championship race. For European rounds, FIA GT1 would be joined at the circuit by the FIA GT3 European Championship.

Entries

Manufacturers

The SRO initially expected at least five manufacturers to participate in the inaugural 2010 season.  A maximum of six manufacturers would be accepted, with each manufacturer limited to supplying two privateer teams of no more than two cars.  To ensure close competition, each model of car would be tested by the FIA to determine any mandatory adjustments for performance balancing. The FIA employed Christophe Bouchut, Anthony Davidson, and Heinz-Harald Frentzen for balance of performance test sessions held at Circuit Paul Ricard as well as just prior to the first race event at Yas Marina Circuit.

, three manufacturers had announced their entries for the 2010 season.  Nissan's performance division, Nismo, developed their GT-R for GT1; the GT-R was initially tested for the World Championship by competing in select 2009 FIA GT events with Gigawave Motorsport.  Ford also used 2009 as a development year for its Ford GT race car built by Matech Concepts. Lamborghini was the third announced manufacturer, fielding a car based on the Murciélago LP670-4 SV and built by Reiter Engineering who had built the previous GT1-spec Murciélago R-GT.

Following the announcement of the initial three manufacturers, Aston Martin Racing and Prodrive submitted a proposal to the FIA World Motor Sport Council for modifications to the existing Aston Martin DBR9 to allow customers to enter the series.  The FIA would be required to make technical waivers on the DBR9 in order for it to be allowed to compete. General Motors' Corvette brand also asked for a technical waiver on a modification to their 2009 Corvette C6.Rs in order to compete in 2010. Maserati and Saleen also sought those technical waivers for their 2009 cars, but required a further waiver due to the MC12 and S7 not meeting the minimum requirement of 300 production cars for the 2010 regulations.  In November 2009, the SRO confirmed their six manufacturers for the 2010 season, allowing Corvette, Aston Martin, and Maserati their technical waivers to join Nissan, Ford, and Lamborghini.

Teams
For the teams which represented each of the six manufacturers, two privateers were selected by each manufacturer. During the launch of the FIA GT1 World Championship, Matech Concepts and VDS Racing Team announced their continuation with the Ford GT project. Hexis Racing of France also announced their intent to participate in the series with Aston Martin, joining fellow FIA GT3 European Championship competitor Fischer Racing which would participate under the Young Driver AMR title. Swiss Racing Team announced on 5 November that they would enter using the Nissan GT-R, to team alongside Sumo Power GT which replaced the departing 2009 development team of Gigawave Motorsport.

Maserati retained the five-time FIA GT champions Vitaphone Racing Team, while the second squad was formed by Altfrid Heger's Triple H Team Hegersport of Germany. Corvette also retained several of its privateer teams from the FIA GT Championship, with DKR Engineering and Selleslagh Racing Team combining their C6.Rs to form Mad Croc Racing, and Phoenix Racing and Carsport Holland merging into Phoenix Racing Carsport. Lamborghini would be represented by previous Lamborghini FIA GT campaigners Reiter and Münnich Motorsport.

On 17 January 2010 the SRO confirmed the twelve teams which had submitted entries for the championship.

Drivers
Each event comprised 48 drivers, with many of these drivers featuring in every round of the season. The full-season line-up included drivers from varying backgrounds, including experienced sports car drivers and relative newcomers. Seven former FIA GT Champions were contracted with teams, including three-time co-champions Michael Bartels and Andrea Bertolini once again sharing a Vitaphone Maserati. Fellow three-time champion Christophe Bouchut drove one of Münnich Motorsports' Lamborghinis, while 1998 champion Ricardo Zonta returned with the fellow Lamborghini at Reiter. 1999 champion and the record holder for most FIA GT wins, Karl Wendlinger was enlisted by Swiss Racing Team for Nissan while 2000 champion Jamie Campbell-Walter drove the Nissan of Sumo Power.  2003 champion Matteo Bobbi returned to a Maserati for the Hegersport squad. Other sports car veterans included 2004 24 Hours of Le Mans winner Seiji Ara at Swiss Racing, 2007 FIA GT3 Champion Henri Moser at Hexis, 2008 Le Mans Series champions Tomáš Enge and Stefan Mücke co-driving for Young Driver AMR, former American Le Mans Series champions Mika Salo and Oliver Gavin driving a Mad-Croc Corvette, and two-time Super GT champion Michael Krumm with Sumo Power.

Several drivers already had world championship experience in other forms of motorsport, including the Formula One World Championship and World Touring Car Championship. Romain Grosjean moved directly from a 2009 seat at Renault F1 to drive for Matech Competition in GT1, while former Formula One driver Enrique Bernoldi, who had won races during his rookie season in the 2009 FIA GT Championship, switched to Vitaphone Maserati.  Jean-Denis Délétraz was another driver with experience in grand prix racing. Drivers making the transition from touring car racing to sports cars included Hegersport founder Altfrid Heger and 2005 WTCC Independents Champion Marc Hennerici.

A unique driver line-up amongst the field of 24 cars was the No.6 Matech Ford which featuring the only females in the series. The two Swiss women, Natacha Gachnang and Cyndie Allemann, both had experience in various open wheel racing series, but were teaming together to make their debuts in sports car racing.

Entry list
On 27 January 2010 the FIA published the full entry list of teams and manufacturers for the 2010 season.
On 26 February 2010 the SRO published a first partial entry-list of drivers. All teams used Michelin tyres.

Results and standings

Race results

Championships
Championship points were awarded for the first three positions in each qualifying race and for the first ten positions in each championship race. Entries had to complete 75% of the winning car's race distance in order to be classified and earn points. Individual drivers were required to participate for a minimum of 25 minutes in order to earn championship points in any race.

Drivers' Championship

Teams' Championship
Prior to the Nürburgring round, Phoenix Racing / Carsport informed the FIA that they were no longer able to enter the No. 14 Corvette due to the car being returned to its private owner.  Phoenix's inability to enter two cars for the remainder of the season led race stewards to deem the team to be in violation of GT1 regulations.  This required the team to forfeit all points earned over the course of the season, and team points from the Nürburgring round onward would also be redistributed to other competitors finishing behind the remaining Phoenix entry. Prior to the San Luis finale, Mad-Croc also failed to maintain a two-car entry and forfeited their Teams' Championship points.

SRO Trophy for Manufacturers
The SRO Trophy for Manufacturers was established mid-season by the SRO Group as an award for the best of the season's six manufacturers, although unlike the Drivers' and Teams' Championships it was not an official FIA championship. Rankings for the Trophy were based on the results for each car in both the Qualifying and Championship Races, with all finishing cars in points earning positions combining their points toward the manufacturer's total.  Aston Martin secured the inaugural Trophy, having previously won the FIA GT Manufacturers' Cup in 2006.

References

External links

 FIA GT1 World Championship As archived at web.archive.org on 15 December 2010

 
FIA GT1